Sylvia Michel (born 19 December 1972) is a German footballer. She played in one match for the Germany women's national football team in 1994.

References

External links
 

1972 births
Living people
German women's footballers
Germany women's international footballers
Place of birth missing (living people)
Women's association footballers not categorized by position